Krasnoye is a rural locality (a khutor) in Aydarovskoye Rural Settlement, Ramonsky District, Voronezh Oblast, Russia. The population was 467 as of 2010. There are 5 streets.

Geography 
Krasnoye is located 7 km northwest of Ramon (the district's administrative centre) by road. Bogdanovo is the nearest rural locality.

References 

Rural localities in Ramonsky District